German submarine U-2326 was a Type XXIII U-boat of Nazi Germany's Kriegsmarine during World War II. She was ordered on 20 September 1943, and was laid down on 8 May 1944 at Deutsche Werft, Hamburg, as yard number 480. She was launched on 17 July 1944 and commissioned under the command of Oberleutnant zur See Karl Jobst on 10 August 1944.

Design
Like all Type XXIII U-boats, U-2326 had a displacement of  when at the surface and  while submerged. The submarine was powered by one MWM six-cylinder RS134S diesel engine providing , one AEG GU4463-8 double-acting electric motor electric motor providing , and one BBC silent running CCR188 electric motor providing .

U-2326 was fitted with two  torpedo tubes in the bow. She could carry two preloaded torpedoes. The complement was 14–18 men. This class of U-boat did not carry a deck gun.

Service history
On 14 May 1945, U-2326 surrendered at Dundee, Scotland. She would go on to become a British Type-N-class submarine renamed N35 and later be transferred to France in 1946. However, she was sunk 6 December 1946, in an accident in Toulon with the loss of 21 lives. While many sources claim that the boat was later raised and broken up for scrap, the French Navy does not raise warships that suffered a loss of life as they are viewed as military graves, so these claims seem highly unlikely.

See also
 Battle of the Atlantic

References

Bibliography

External links

U-boats commissioned in 1944
World War II submarines of Germany
1944 ships
Type XXIII submarines
Ships built in Hamburg
Maritime incidents in 1946